Mimalblymoroides spinipennis is a species of beetle in the family Cerambycidae. It was described by Breuning in 1970. It is known from Papua New Guinea.

References

Desmiphorini
Beetles described in 1970